Belenois subeida, the northern caper white, is a butterfly in the family Pieridae. It is found in Guinea, Burkina Faso, Ivory Coast, Ghana, Nigeria, Cameroon, Sudan, the Democratic Republic of the Congo, the Central African Republic, Ethiopia, Kenya, Uganda and Tanzania. The habitat consists of forests and dense woodland.

The larvae feed on Capparis, Maerua and Ritchiea species.

Subspecies
Belenois subeida subeida (Sudan, northern and eastern Democratic Republic of the Congo, Central African Republic, northern Uganda)
Belenois subeida frobeniusi  (Strand, 1909) (Guinea, Burkina Faso, northern Ivory Coast, Ghana, Nigeria, northern Cameroon)
Belenois subeida hailo  (Ungemach, 1932) (Ethiopia)
Belenois subeida sylvander  Grose-Smith, 1890 (Uganda, western Kenya, Tanzania)

References

External links
Seitz, A. Die Gross-Schmetterlinge der Erde 13: Die Afrikanischen Tagfalter. Plate XIII 13

Butterflies described in 1865
Pierini
Butterflies of Africa
Taxa named by Baron Cajetan von Felder
Taxa named by Rudolf Felder